Beasts of Prey (육식동물 - Yukshik dongmul), also known as Carnivore and Carnivorous Animals, is a 1985 South Korean film directed by Kim Ki-young.

Plot
A social drama about a man with an inferiority complex to his wife. When he seeks consolation in an extramarital affair, his mistress and wife conspire to set up a plan for sharing him.

Cast
Kim Sung-kyom
No Gyeong-sin
Chung Jae-soon
Kim Seong-geun
Han U-ri
Yang Hui-ran
Eom Sim-jeong
Bae Gyu-bin
Choe Il
Yeo Jae-ha

References

Bibliography

External links

1980s Korean-language films
Films directed by Kim Ki-young
South Korean drama films